Synomelix is a genus of parasitoid wasps belonging to the family Ichneumonidae.

The species of this genus are found in Europe and Northern America.

Species:
 Synomelix albipes (Gravenhorst, 1829) 
 Synomelix faciator Idar, 1983

References

Ichneumonidae
Ichneumonidae genera